KDNO (101.7 FM) is a classic country radio station in Thermopolis, Wyoming. The station is owned by Jerry and Steve Edwards, through licensee Edwards Communications, LC and features programming from CBS News Radio and Compass Media Networks. The majority owner of Edwards Communications, LC is also the owner of KFCW and KWYW.  The call letters used to belong to what is now KDFO-FM in Delano, California from 1970 to 1997. KDNO covers most of Hot Springs County and reaches most of Fremont County and can be heard in Riverton and as far north as Worland.

Facilities
The station shares its antenna with KWYW on Copper Mountain.

History
The station was assigned the call letters KBIK on January 22, 1999.  On September 9, 1999, the station changed its call sign to KDNO.

References

External links

DNO
Classic country radio stations in the United States
Hot Springs County, Wyoming
2001 establishments in Wyoming
Radio stations established in 2001